Drei Höfe is a municipality in the district of Wasseramt in the canton of Solothurn in Switzerland.  On 1 January 2013 the former municipalities of Heinrichswil-Winistorf and Hersiwil merged to form the new municipality of Drei Höfe.

History
Heinrichswil is first mentioned in 1317 as Cristan von Heinrichswile.

Hersiwil is first mentioned in 1324 as Hersenwile.  It formed a double municipality with Heinrichswil until 1798, when Winistorf joined the other two to form the triple municipality of Hersiwil-Heinrichswil-Winistorf.  In 1854 it split into three, separate, independent municipalities.  In 1993, Heinrichswil and Winistorf merged again, but Hersiwil remained independent.

Geography

Of this area,  or 50.8% is used for agricultural purposes, while  or 40.3% is forested. Of the rest of the land,  or 8.0% is settled (buildings or roads). The former municipality is located on a hill built up from a moraine on the road between Halten and Seeberg. It consists of the villages of Heinrichswil and Winistorf.

Of this area,  or 67.8% is used for agricultural purposes, while  or 22.4% is forested.

Demographics

Historic Population
The historical population is given in the following chart:

References

External links

 
 

Municipalities of the canton of Solothurn